Sueviota atrinasa, the blacknose dwarfgoby, is a species of fish in the family Gobiidae. found in Indo-West Pacific.This species reaches a length of .

References

atrinasa
Taxa named by Richard Winterbottom
Taxa named by Douglass F. Hoese
Fish described in 1988